Jack Danta' Golden (born January 28, 1977) is a former American football linebacker in the National Football League (NFL). He was signed by the New York Giants as an undrafted free agent in 2000 after playing college football at Oklahoma State.
Golden later won a Super Bowl with the Tampa Bay Buccaneers.

References

1977 births
Living people
American football linebackers
Oklahoma State Cowboys football players
New York Giants players
Tampa Bay Buccaneers players